The End of the Affair is a 1951 novel by Graham Greene.

The End of the Affair may also refer to:
The End of the Affair (1955 film), a 1955 film directed by Edward Dmytryk
The End of the Affair (1999 film), a 1999 drama film directed by Neil Jordan
The End of the Affair (opera), a 2004 chamber opera 
"The End of the Affair" (The Vampire Diaries), an episode of the television series The Vampire Diaries